Rajucollota (possibly from Quechua rahu snow, ice, mountain with snow, qulluta, kalluta mortar), Suerococha (possibly from Quechua suyru very long dress tracked after when worn, qucha lake,), named after the nearby lake, or Diablo Mudo (Spanish for "dumb devil") is a mountain in the west of the Huayhuash mountain range in the Andes of Peru, about  high. It is located in the Ancash Region, Bolognesi Province, Pacllon District, and in the Lima Region, Cajatambo Province, Copa District. Rajucollota lies on a sub-range west of Yerupaja, west of the mountain Huacrish, northwest of the mountain Auxilio and north of the lake Suerococha.

References

Mountains of Peru
Mountains of Ancash Region
Mountains of Lima Region